Castelbellino is a comune (municipality) in the Province of Ancona in the Italian region Marche, located about  southwest of Ancona.

Castelbellino borders the following municipalities: Jesi, Maiolati Spontini, Monte Roberto.

References

External links 
  Official website

Cities and towns in the Marche